Ibrahim Sidibe (born 10 August 1980 in Nguidile) is a Senegalese professional football striker who plays for Belgian club Sporting Hasselt.

Club career

Debrecen
In the summer of 2005 Ibrahim signed a contract with Debreceni VSC. He scored 15 goals in 28 matches during his first season, whilst in his second he scored 17 goals in 27 matches. That makes him 2 times to topscorer of the Hungarian top football league. In his third season he did not extend his contract, played 14 matches and he had to play as a leftback. As a result of that, he was not selected in the squad for the 2008 Africa Cup of Nations in Ghana.

In January 2008, Sidibe moved to Sint-Truiden where he became a success, scoring many goals and helping the club promoting to the highest level in Belgian football. The following season, he played a fantastic season with Sint-Truidense, and fought for European football with Sint-Truidense, but ultimately Racing Genk was proven to be too big a mouthful.

In May 2011, Sidibe signed a three-year contract with Beerschot before departing from Sint-Truiden in July the same year.

Debreceni EAC
On 11 April 2018 he was signed by Nemzeti Bajnokság III club, Debreceni EAC.

Honours
 Hungarian League (2):
 2005–2006, 2006–2007
Individual:
Zilahi Prize: 2007

References

External links
 
 

1980 births
Living people
Senegalese footballers
Senegal international footballers
Association football forwards
CS Sfaxien players
WSG Tirol players
FC Wacker Innsbruck players
FC Juniors OÖ players
SV Ried players
Debreceni VSC players
Sint-Truidense V.V. players
Beerschot A.C. players
K.V.C. Westerlo players
Nemzeti Bajnokság I players
Belgian Pro League players
Senegalese expatriate footballers
Expatriate footballers in Tunisia
Expatriate footballers in Germany
Expatriate footballers in Austria
Expatriate footballers in Hungary
Expatriate footballers in Belgium
Senegalese expatriate sportspeople in Tunisia
Senegalese expatriate sportspeople in Germany
Senegalese expatriate sportspeople in Austria
Senegalese expatriate sportspeople in Hungary
Senegalese expatriate sportspeople in Belgium
Bahlinger SC players